Dianna Hutts Aston (born August 12, 1964) is an American author specializing in books on science and nature, especially for children. She attended the University of Houston to study Journalism and Political Science. She has gained acclaim in literary and science circles for her 'poetic' style. She collaborates with illustrators that produce bright colorful images. She has appeared as an expert guest on NPR's Science Friday. Among her many awards and citations, she has been a finalist and winner of the AAAS/Subaru SB&F Prize for Excellence in Science Books several times. President Barack Obama and First Lady Michelle Obama chose her book "The Moon Over Star" to read to a Washington DC classroom in February 2009.

In addition to her writing, Aston has initiated social outreach programs: The Oz Project for disadvantaged Mexican children, SOS Message in a Bottle Project and This is America for victims of violent crimes. Aston makes her home in Port Aransas, Texas.

Bibliography

References

External links
 

American children's writers
American science writers
Writers from Houston
1964 births
Living people
People from Port Aransas, Texas